Samuel E. Squires (September 27, 1882 – July 25, 1967) was an American politician who served as a member of the Wisconsin State Assembly.

Background
Squires was born in Iowa. During World War I, he served in the United States Army, achieving the rank of captain.

Squires was a Republican. He was elected to the Wisconsin State Assembly from 1942 to 1948. During his career as an assemblyman, he was a member of a group of northern Wisconsin legislators known as the "Woodchoppers," who favored reintroducing bounties on wolves and other predators. In addition to serving in the Assembly, he was town chairman of Mason, Wisconsin and a member of the Bayfield County Board.

References

People from Iowa
People from Bayfield County, Wisconsin
Republican Party members of the Wisconsin State Assembly
Mayors of places in Wisconsin
Military personnel from Iowa
United States Army officers
United States Army personnel of World War I
1882 births
1967 deaths
20th-century American politicians